Bren MacDibble (née McGregor; born 1966) is a New Zealand-born writer of children's and young adult books based in Australia. Bren also writes under the name Cally Black. She uses the alias to distinguish between books written for younger children (under the name Bren MacDibble) and books written for young adults (under the name Cally Black).

Biography 
MacDibble was born in Whanganui, New Zealand. She was raised on farms around the central North Island of New Zealand. Bren lived in Melbourne, Victoria, Australia for 20 years and now lives on the midwest coast of Western Australia.

In 2015, Bren won the Ampersand Prize with Hardie Grant Egmont for her first trade novel In the Dark Spaces. This was quickly followed by her first children's trade novel How to Bee with Allen & Unwin.  Both books won New Zealand Book Awards in 2018. The first time any author has picked up awards in two different categories in the same year. How to Bee picked up a Children's Book Council of Australia (CBCA) Book of the Year - Younger readers that same year.

In 2018, Bren was awarded a Neilma Sidney Literary Travel Fund to research her children's novel The Dog Runner.

Publications 

 How to Bee (Allen & Unwin, Aus/NZ, 2017) (Old Barn Books, UK, 2018) (Groundwood Books, Can/US, 2020) La Deniere Abeille (Helium Editions, France, 2020)
 In the Dark Spaces (Hardie Grant Egmont, Aus/NZ 2017)
 The Dog Runner (Allen & Unwin, Aus/NZ, 2019) (Old Barn Books, UK, 2019)
 Across the Risen Sea (Allen & Unwin, Aus/NZ, 2020) (Old Barn Books, UK, 2020)
 The Raven's Song written with Zana Fraillon (Allen & Unwin, Aus/NZ, 2022) (Old Barn Books, UK, 2022)

Awards  

How to Bee
Winner: New Zealand Book Awards for Children and Young Adults - Junior Fiction (the Wright Family Foundation Esther Glen Award) 2018
Winner: Children's Book Council of Australia (CBCA) Book of the Year 2018 - Younger readers
Winner: Patricia Wrightson Prize, New South Wales Premier's Literary Awards, 2018
Shortlisted: South Australian Festival Literary Prize
Shortlisted: Norma K Heming Award 2018
Shortlisted: Aurealis Award
Shortlisted: Ditmar Award results 2018
Shortlisted: Book of the Year, Speech Pathology Australia
Longlisted: The North Somerset Teachers' Book Awards, UK, Moving On Category 2018
In the Dark Spaces (as Cally Black)
Winner: Ampersand Prize with Hardie Grant Egmont
Winner: New Zealand Book Awards for Children and Young Adults - Young Adult Fiction (the Copyright Licensing NZ Award)
Winner: Queensland Literary Awards - Griffiths University Young Adult Book Award 2018
Winner: Aurealis Award for best young adult novel 2017
Honour Book: Children's Book Council of Australia (CBCA) 2018
Highly Commended: the Victorian Premier's Literary Prize
Shortlisted: West Australian Young Readers' Book Awards 2019
Shortlisted: YABBAs - Fiction for Years 7-9 2019
Shortlisted: Inky Award 2018
Shortlisted: Ditmar Award results 2018
Shortlisted: Ethel Turner Prize in the NSW Premiers Awards 2018
The Dog Runner
Winner: New Zealand Book Awards for Children and Young Adults - Junior Fiction (the Wright Family Foundation Esther Glen Award) 2019
Winner: Aurealis Award for Best Children's Fiction 2019
Shortlisted: Children's Book Council of Australia, Book of the Year, Younger Readers
Shortlisted in the Readings Children's Book Prize 2020
Nominated for the 2020 CILIP Carnegie Medal
Across the Risen Sea
Longlisted: UK Literary Association Awards 2022
Shortlisted: Western Australian Premier's Book Awards for Writing for Children 2020
Shortlisted: Aurealis Award for best children's fiction
Nominated for the 2021 CILIP Carnegie Medal
Shortlisted: Patricia Wrightson Prize, New South Wales Premier's Literary Awards, 2021
Shortlisted: New Zealand Book Awards for Children and Young Adults – Junior Fiction, 2021
Shortlisted: Speech Pathology Book of the Year Awards 2021
A Children's Book Council of Australia Notable Book 2021

References

External links
 
 

1966 births
Living people
People from Whanganui
21st-century New Zealand writers
21st-century Australian writers
21st-century New Zealand women writers
21st-century Australian women writers
Australian children's writers
New Zealand children's writers
New Zealand women children's writers
Pseudonymous women writers
21st-century pseudonymous writers